Epicrocis pulchra is a species of snout moth in the genus Epicrocis. It was described by Marianne Horak in 1997 and is known from Queensland, Australia.

References

Moths described in 1997
Phycitini
Endemic fauna of Australia
Moths of Australia
Taxa named by Marianne Horak